The National Association to Advance Fat Acceptance (NAAFA) is a non-profit, fat acceptance civil-rights organization in the United States dedicated to improving the quality of life for fat people.  NAAFA works to eliminate discrimination based on body size and provide fat people with the tools for self-empowerment through public education, advocacy, and member support.

History
NAAFA was founded in 1969 by Bill Fabrey in Rochester, New York as the "National Association to Aid Fat Americans." In its early years, social activities and letter-writing campaigns were a major part of the organization. As the organization turned more toward political activism, the name was changed during the 1980s.

NAAFA has a yearly national convention in summer, which is usually alternated between the east and west coasts. In 2008 they introduced the "NAAFA Size Diversity Toolkit" to educate corporations on quality of life issues. As part of its ongoing campaign, NAAFA also opposes airline policies regarding charging fat people for each seat they use.

In popular culture
Penn & Teller featured NAAFA on the Showtime series Bullshit! in the episode "Obesity" (aired March 24, 2007).
 Family Guy parodied NAAFA as the "National Association for the Advancement of Fat People."
 The Simpsons spoofed NAAFA as an organization called "Big Is Beautiful" in the episode "Walking Big & Tall".
My 600-lb Life mentioned by past member “Zsalynn” in Season 2; Episode 1.

References

External links

Official website

Civil rights organizations in the United States
Fat acceptance movement
Disability organizations based in the United States
Support groups